Juan Pablo Pereyra (born 30 May 1984 in San Lorenzo) is an Argentine football midfielder or forward.

Career
Pereyra made his playing debut in 2006 for El Linqueño in the regionalised 4th division of Argentine football. In 2006, he joined 2nd division side Tigre where he was part of the squad that won promotion to the Primera División in 2007.

Between 2007 and 2008 he played for Uruguayan side Nacional where he scored three goals in 18 league appearances.

In 2008, he returned to Argentine football, joining Atlético Tucumán of the 2nd division. He helped the team to win the 2008-09 championship and secure automatic promotion to the Primera División.

On July 17, 2010 Pereyra signed with Estudiantes de La Plata for a reported transfer fee of close to $500,000.

In July 2011, he signed a one-year loan deal with Unión de Santa Fe and on 16 August 2012, moved to his former club Atlético Tucumán on a free transfer.

Honours
Atlético Tucumán
Primera B Nacional: 2008–09
Estudiantes
Argentine Primera División: 2010 Apertura

References

External links
 Argentine Primera statistics at Fútbol XXI  
 
 BDFA profile 
 

1984 births
Living people
People from San Lorenzo Department
Argentine footballers
Argentine expatriate footballers
Association football forwards
Club Atlético Tigre footballers
Atlético Tucumán footballers
Club Nacional de Football players
Estudiantes de La Plata footballers
Unión de Santa Fe footballers
Ferro Carril Oeste footballers
Independiente Rivadavia footballers
Club Atlético Colegiales (Argentina) players
Club Cipolletti footballers
Central Córdoba de Rosario footballers
Argentine Primera División players
Primera B Metropolitana players
Torneo Federal A players
Argentine expatriate sportspeople in Uruguay
Expatriate footballers in Uruguay
Sportspeople from Santa Fe Province